James Phelan Jr. (December 7, 1856 – January 30, 1891) was a nineteenth-century lawyer and politician from Tennessee. He served as a United States Congressman from Tennessee, representing the tenth district.

Biography
Phelan was born in Aberdeen, Mississippi to James Phelan Sr., a member of the Confederate Congress, and Eliza J Phelan. He was of Irish descent on his father's side, and Scottish descent on his mother' side. He attended various schools. In 1874 he went abroad, and in 1878 received his Ph.D. from the University of Leipzig, having written his dissertation on the life and works of Philip Massinger. Returning to the United States, he married Mary Early of Virginia, with whom he had three children.

Career
In 1881, Phelan became the owner of The Avalanche, a newspaper in Memphis, Tennessee. He was admitted to the Tennessee bar that same year, and began the practice of law in Memphis.

Elected as a Democrat to the United States House of Representatives, Phelan served in that body from March 4, 1887, until his death in 1891.  During his term in the House, he published his book, History of Tennessee, the Making of a State.

Death
Phelan died in Nassau, Bahamas on January 30, 1891. He is interred at Elmwood Cemetery in Memphis, Tennessee.

See also
List of United States Congress members who died in office (1790–1899)

References

External links

Who Was Who in America, Historical Volume, 1607-1896. Chicago: Quincy Who's Who, 1963.

1856 births
1891 deaths
19th-century American newspaper publishers (people)
American people of Irish descent
People from Memphis, Tennessee
People from Aberdeen, Mississippi
Leipzig University alumni
American publishers (people)
Democratic Party members of the United States House of Representatives from Tennessee
19th-century American journalists
Journalists from Tennessee
American male journalists
19th-century American male writers
19th-century American politicians